Adam Maligov (born 6 May 1993) is a Russian weightlifter, and European Champion competing in the 94 kg category.

Career
In 2014 he was the silver medalist in the 85 kg category. In 2017 he became European Champion in the 94 kg category, by virtue of completing his 208 kg Clean and Jerk, giving him the winning total of 388 kg before Dmytro Chumak lifted his final Clean and Jerk of 214 kg, giving Chumak 388 kg as well.

Major results

References

1993 births
Living people
Russian male weightlifters
European Weightlifting Championships medalists